John Love is a United States magistrate judge of the United States District Court for the Eastern District of Texas since 2006.

Education
Love is a native of Tyler, Texas and attended Robert E. Lee High School. Love graduated from Texas A&M University cum laude and received his Juris Doctor degree from St. Mary's University Law School in 1995, where he served as the Associate Editor of the St. Mary's Law Journal and was a part of the winning team in the Freshman and Walker Moot Court Competitions. During law school, Love served as a judicial intern to the Honorable Emilio Garza of the U.S. Court of Appeals for the Fifth Circuit and received American Jurisprudence awards in the courses of Torts, Civil Procedure and Moot Court.

Career
Upon graduation from law school, Love went into private practice in San Antonio, doing primarily civil trial litigation. Afterwards, he returned to Tyler to serve as Chief Staff Attorney with the 12th Texas Court of Appeals. In 2002, Love served as the Chief Staff Attorney of U.S. District Judge Leonard Davis of the U.S. District Court for the Eastern District of Texas.

On January 3, 2006, Love was sworn in as a U.S. Magistrate Judge for the U.S. District Court for the Eastern District of Texas. Love and Judge K. Nicole Mitchell are currently the only two U.S. Magistrate Judges in the Tyler, Texas division of the U.S. District Court for the Eastern District of Texas. After U.S. District Judge Leonard Davis retired in 2015, Judge Jeremy Kernodle took the bench as a U.S. District Judge in Tyler during 2018 and Judge J. Campbell Barker took the bench as a U.S. District Judge in Tyler during 2019.

Among the accolades awarded to Love are the Smith County Outstanding Young Lawyer of the Year (2006). He has also previously served as a director and Fellow of the Smith County Bar Foundation, has held several positions in the Smith County Young Lawyer's Association, and is a Fellow of the Texas Bar Foundation. Love has also assisted Habitat for Humanity, participated in various school crime prevention programs, and has been a guest lecturer at the University of Texas at Tyler as well as Tyler Junior College.

Due to the high number of patent cases he has heard by virtue of being a judge in the Eastern District of Texas, which hears the most patent cases in the country, Love has also been a panelist on numerous IP, patent law and federal practice seminars and conferences and is the co-author of the law review article "Complex Patent Cases: Observations from the Bench,"  13 SMU Sci. & Tech. L. Rev. 121 (2010).

See also
United States District Court for the Eastern District of Texas
United States Court of Appeals for the Fifth Circuit

References

External links
The Honorable John D. Love, United States District Court for the Eastern District of Texas
The Honorable John D. Love - Mediator Bio at the U.S. Court of Appeals for the Federal Circuit

Living people
American lawyers
Texas A&M University alumni
United States magistrate judges
People from Tyler, Texas
21st-century American judges
Year of birth missing (living people)
St. Mary's University School of Law alumni